Reza Jabbari (born August 28, 1977 in Tehran) is a retired Iranian footballer.
In 2000, he joined Persepolis with his teammate and friend in Bahman, Hassan Khanmohammadi.

Club career

Club career statistics

Honours
Persepolis
 Iran Pro League: 2001–02

References

1977 births
Living people
Iranian footballers
Persepolis F.C. players
F.C. Aboomoslem players
Tractor S.C. players
Association football midfielders
Iran international footballers